The J. K. Gill Company Building is an historic building in Portland, Oregon. The structure once served as the J. K. Gill Company's flagship store. It was added to the National Register of Historic Places in February 2021.

See also
 National Register of Historic Places listings in South and Southwest Portland, Oregon

References

Buildings and structures in Portland, Oregon
Chicago school architecture in Oregon
National Register of Historic Places in Portland, Oregon
Southwest Portland, Oregon